Crane is a city in and the county seat of Crane County, Texas, United States. Its population is about 3,680 as of 2018. An oil boomtown since the 1920s, Crane is still in the center of a prominent oil-producing region. It is the only significant town in sparsely populated Crane County, and contains the only post office in the county.

History
While the post office dates from 1908, the discovery of oil in 1926 in the Permian Basin brought in enough fortune-seekers to populate a town. Streets are named for the children of O.C. Kinnison, the realtor who drew up the town map. By 1930, Crane was a full-fledged boomtown, with churches and private businesses operating next to the more nefarious elements of frontier life.  As in other oil boomtowns, development of services lagged behind temporary dwellings for the workers, although paved roads and other basic infrastructure were added following incorporation in the early 1930s.

Peak population as reported by the U.S. Census was in 1960 at 3,796, and it has declined slightly since, although the town remains the center for serving the oil fields in Crane County.

The Museum of the Desert Southwest, the area's museum of local history, is operated by the Crane County Historical Commission.

Geography

Crane is located in eastern Crane County at  (31.392949, –102.350751).

The main highway through Crane is U.S. Route 385, which leads north  to Odessa and south  to McCamey.

Climate

As is typical for the region, Crane has a hot semiarid climate (Köppen BSh) with hot to sweltering summers with occasional thunderstorms and pleasant, dry winters with cold to freezing mornings.

Demographics

2020 census

As of the 2020 United States census, there were 3,478 people, 1,042 households, and 826 families residing in the city.

2000 census
As of the census of 2000,  3,191 people, 1,096 households, and 865 families resided in the city. The population density was 3,129.7 people per square mile (1,207.9/km). The 1,278 housing units averaged 1,253.5 per square mile (483.8/km). The racial makeup of the city was 28.11% White, 3.01% African American, 0.97% Native American, 0.38% Asian, 19.43% from other races, and 2.70% from two or more races. Hispanics or Latinos were 45.41% of the population.

Of the 1,096 households, 43.8% had children under the age of 18 living with them, 66.0% were married couples living together, 8.9% had a female householder with no husband present, and 21.0% were not families. About 19.3% of all households were made up of individuals, and 10.4% had someone living alone who was 65 years of age or older. The average household size was 2.90 and the average family size was 3.35.

In the city, the population was distributed as 32.6% under the age of 18, 7.8% from 18 to 24, 27.4% from 25 to 44, 21.5% from 45 to 64, and 10.7% who were 65 years of age or older. The median age was 33 years. For every 100 females, there were 93.3 males. For every 100 females age 18 and over, there were 89.3 males.

The median income for a household in the city was $31,774, and for a family was $36,386. Males had a median income of $32,250 versus $18,086 for females. The per capita income for the city was $12,776. About 13.0% of families and 13.1% of the population were below the poverty line, including 15.1% of those under age 18 and 8.0% of those age 65 or over.

Education
The city is served by the Crane Independent School District and is home to the Crane High School Golden Cranes.

Notable people

 Kip Averitt, Republican former state senator
 Elmer Kelton, Western novelist
 Kenny Wayne Walker (born 1967), former defensive lineman for the Denver Broncos and the first deaf player to have played in the Canadian Football League and one of only five to have played in the National Football League

References

External links
City of Crane official website

Cities in Texas
Cities in Crane County, Texas
County seats in Texas